is a kata (a set of prearranged techniques) in Judo. It consists in five techniques, known only by their number. Although popular media generally claim that it was developed by Jigoro Kano, recent scientific research has conclusively shown that the kata predates the foundation of Kodokan judo and that Jigoro Kano took it from Tenjin Shinyō-ryū jujutsu and merely imported it into judo after he made minor amendments to it. The kata is considered unfinished. However, a completed performance version of the kata, expanded to ten techniques, was recently presented under the name . The techniques of Itsutsu-no-kata are composed of gentle movements evocative of natural forces.

Techniques 
Ichi - direct concentrated energy - direct push
Ni - deflection - avoid and use Uki otoshi
San - circular energy or whirlpool - using form of Yoko wakare
Shi - action and reaction - as the sea sweeps clean the shore
Go - the void - using form of Yoko wakare

Videos 
Mifune version

References

External links 
 Description from the Judo Information Site.
• https://web.archive.org/web/20081204112420/http://aussiejujitsu.wetpaint.com/page/Kata

Judo kata

de:Kata (Jūdō)#Itsutsu-no-kata
ja:柔道形#五の形